Lunatic Soul is the first solo album by Riverside's vocalist and bass guitarist Mariusz Duda released under the name Lunatic Soul.

Track listing
All songs written by Mariusz Duda, except where noted.

Personnel
Mariusz Duda – vocals, bass, acoustic guitar, percussion
Maciej Szelenbaum - piano, keyboards, flute
Wawrzyniec Dramowicz - drums, percussion
Michał Łapaj - hammond organ
Maciej Meller - e-bow
Anna Maria Buczek - tears

References

2008 albums
Mystic Production albums